Baize is a coarse woollen (or in cheaper variants cotton) cloth, similar in texture to felt, but more durable.

History
A mid-17th-century English ditty—much quoted in histories of ale and beer brewing in England—refers to 1525:

Hops, heresies, bays, and beer;Came into England all in one year.

Heresies refers to the Protestant Reformation, while bays is the Elizabethan spelling for baize.

Applications
It is also found as a writing surface, particularly on 19th century pedestal desks.

The surface finish of baize is coarse, thus increasing rolling resistance and perceptibly slowing billiard balls. Baize is available with and without a perceptible nap. Snooker, in which understanding nap effects is part of the game, uses the nappy variety, while pool and carom billiards use the napless type.

For gaming use, baize is traditionally dyed green, in mimicry of a lawn (see Cue sport, "History"), though wide variety of table colours have become accepted. Bay was similar stuff to Baize but lighter in weight and with a shorter nap.

Idioms and catchphrases
 "Let's get the boys on the baize!" has been a catchphrase of BBC TV snooker presenter Rob Walker since 2008.
 At one time, "the green baize door" (a door to which cloth had been tacked to deaden noise) in a house separated the servants' quarters from the family's living quarters; hence the phrase's usage as a metonym for domestic service. Moving men in ‘’The Railway Children’’ wore green baize aprons.

See also
 Billy the Kid and the Green Baize Vampire

References

External links

 

Cue sports equipment
Pile fabrics
Snooker equipment
Woven fabrics
Waulked textiles

ja:ラシャ